Saúl Antonio Tovar (19382006) was a philosopher and humanist from Argentina. He studied philosophy at the National University of Córdoba where he became a doctor in 1970.

References

External links
 

1938 births
2006 deaths
Argentine philosophers
20th-century Argentine philosophers